The Teleférico de Santo Domingo is an aerial cable car urban transit system in Greater Santo Domingo, operated as part of the Santo Domingo Metro. It is the first urban-transport aerial cable car line in the Dominican Republic. It functions as a typical monocable gondola, and runs for 5 kilometers and a total of four stations, and is connected to the Santo Domingo metro system.

History 
The idea for the construction of a gondola arose as an answer to the chaos of traffic during peak hours, deficiencies in - and the high cost of - public transportation and roadways in Santo Domingo, and the need for a mode of transportation for the populace of the outlying areas of Ríos Isabela y Ozama and the zone to the northeast of the city.

The system was inspired by the Metrocable of Medellín, Colombia, and was designed for the transportation of 6,000 passengers per hour, with 195 cabins which would cycle constantly, with an average of 12 seconds per compartment and a capacity of 10 seated passengers each. The justification of the project was determined to be a comprehensive mobility solution for a total of more than 287,000 citizens of the National District and the municipalities of Santo Domingo Este and Santo Domingo Norte, forming part of the adaptation program of Nueva Barquita.

The cable car system was designed in accordance with universal norms of mobility, to facilitate use throughout the stations by the blind, and people with reduced mobility.

The sky cable system was constructed as an interconnection of the Gualey, Los Tres Brazos and Sabana Perdida sectors, with integration with the Santo Domingo metro and its auxiliary routes, representing a sustainable management model from a social, economic and environmental standpoint. It is estimated that its users will save approximately 30%.

The construction of the cable car system and its four stations required intervention in its surroundings, the assembly of the electromechanical system with five platforms, 36 support towers and the assembly of the cable-carrying tractor. Due to irregular topography at the site of some of the stations, several steps were designed to bridge the distance between the buildings and platforms.

The cable car system was inaugurated on 23 May 2018, and commenced regular operations on 1 July 2018. It has the capacity to transport 6,000 passengers per hour (54,000 per day) in both directions combined, with a schedule from 6 a.m. to 9 p.m.

Route 

The route begins at  station Eduardo Brito on Line 2 of the Santo Domingo metro, with cable car (Teleférico) station #1 (T1), Gualey Station, encompassing the Los Guandules, Ensanche Espaillat, 24 de Abril, María Auxiliadora and Domingo Savio sectors.

The second cable car station (T2), Los Tres Brazos Station, encompasses the Jardines del Ozama, Moisés and Las Lilas sectors, passing through the third station (T3), Sabana Perdida Station, for the Los Palmares, Bello Amanecer, Brisas del Este, Brisa de Los Palmares, La Javilla, La Victoria, Sabana Perdida Centro, Villa Blanca, Salomé Ureña, La Barquita Norte, Cerros del Paraíso and Sabana Perdida Norte sectors, arriving at Charles de Gaulle station (T4), in Santo Domingo Norte, for a total distance travelled of 5 kilometers.

Stations 
The cable car system of Santo Domingo includes a total of 4 stations in a 5-kilometer route, which is integrated into the urban dynamics of place, through the treatment of public spaces, platforms, green areas and circulation for pedestrians and vehicles.

The stations are integrated with the Santo Domingo metro via a connecting tunnel between Eduardo Brito Station (L2) and Gualey Station (T1).

 Gualey Station T1 is located on the banks of the Ozama River; it is a return station, connected to the metro system.
 Los Tres Brazos Station T2 is a power station where the axis of the cable car changes direction approximately 35º.
 Sabana Perdida Station T3 is a commuter station. Being the largest, it serves as a garage with capacity for 215 cable car cabins.
 Charles de Gaulle Station T4 is a return station, located on the Charles de Gaulle highway.

Criticisms 

The cable car system received widespread criticism - particularly on social media platforms - from various sectors of the society, due to the possibility of malfunction, the placement of the towers in poor locations (such as blocking streets), and the insecurity of having a cable car passing above homes and schools. An additional criticism arises from the fact that the cable car shows the poverty of the city when traveling over the marginal sectors of Santo Domingo, such as the neighborhoods located on the banks of the Ozama River.

Through an education campaign, the Office for the Reordering of Transport (OPRET) issued statements on the operation of the cable car and on possible system failures. 

There are also favorable opinions from citizens, who view the cable car as a response to the chaos of public transportation in Santo Domingo.

Future lines 
In the 2019 national budget, the President of the Republic included RD$ 4 billion for the construction of a second cable car line. The second line will run a total of 11 kilometers, and will connect the Los Alcarrizos sector with kilometer 9 of the Duarte highway with six stations.

References

External Links 
Página web del Teleférico de Santo Domingo

Aerial tramways
Transport in the Dominican Republic